John Sangster (born 21 January 1942) is an Australian cricketer. He played in two first-class matches for South Australia between 1961 and 1963.

See also
 List of South Australian representative cricketers

References

External links
 

1942 births
Living people
Australian cricketers
South Australia cricketers
Cricketers from Adelaide